Serena Williams and Venus Williams were the defending champions, but chose not to compete.
Lindsay Davenport and Liezel Huber won in the final against Chan Yung-jan and Zheng Jie, 7–5, 6–7(8–10), [10–8].

Seeds

Draw

Draw

References
 Doubles draw

Silicon Valley Classic
Bank of the West Classic - Doubles
Bank of the West Classic - Doubles